Karl Edvard Diriks (9 January 1855 – 17 March 1930) was a Norwegian painter.

Biography
He was born in Christiania (now Oslo, Norway) to Christian Ludvig Diriks and Benedicte Henriette Munch. He was a grandson of government minister Christian Adolph Diriks  (1775–1837) and a nephew of maritime officer and lighthouse director Carl Frederik Diriks (1814–1895).
 
He began to study in Germany where he became acquainted with Norwegian and German painters Christian Krohg, Hans Gude, Frits Thaulow and Max Klinger. He first studied to become an architect at Karlsruhe from 1874 to 1875.  He accompanied Krohg and Klinger to Berlin in the autumn of 1875 as a student at the Bauakademie.

In the autumn of 1879 he settled in Christiania. On his first trip to Paris in 1882–83, he had become acquainted with Impressionism.
He married in 1892, to Swedish-born artist and sculptor Anna Diriks (1870-1932) and settled in Drøbak. They resided in France between 1899 and 1921. They settled in 1922 at Drøbak.

He is known for his naturalist outdoor paintings of clouds, rain squalls, snow flurry, storms and rough seas. He is represented with thirteen works in the National Gallery of Norway, in a number of other Norwegian galleries, and in galleries in France and Germany. He was decorated Knight, First Class of the Order of St. Olav, and Officer of the French Legion of Honour in 1920.

Gallery

References

1855 births
1930 deaths
Artists from Oslo
Norwegian expatriates in France
19th-century Norwegian painters
20th-century Norwegian painters
Norwegian male painters
Norwegian portrait painters
Norwegian landscape painters
Officiers of the Légion d'honneur
People from Frogn
19th-century Norwegian male artists
20th-century Norwegian male artists